Discus is a genus of small air-breathing land snails, terrestrial pulmonate gastropod mollusks in the family Discidae, the disk snails.

Distribution 
Distribution of the genus Discus include Europe, northern Asia and North America.

Description 
Discus species have small or medium shells with ribs. The umbilicus is wide.

Species
Species in this genus include:

subgenus Discus Fitzinger, 1833
 Discus ruderatus Férussac, 1821 – type species

subgenus Gonyodiscus Fitzinger, 1833
 Discus perspectivus J. C. M. von Mühlfeld, 1816
 Discus rotundatus (O. F. Müller, 1774) – rotund disc

subgenus ?
 Discus brunsoni Berry, 1955 – Lake Disc
 Discus bryanti (Harper, 1881) – saw-tooth disc, sawtooth disc
 Discus catskillensis (Pilsbry, 1896) – angular disc
 Discus clappi (Pilsbry, 1924) – channelled disc
 Discus engonatus Shuttleworth, 1852 – extinct
 Discus ganodus Mabille, 1882
 Discus gomerensis Rähle, 1994
 Discus guerinianus R. T. Lowe, 1852
 Discus kompsus J. Mabille, 1883
 Discus macclintocki F. C. Baker, 1928 – Iowa pleistocene snail, Pleistocene disc
 Discus marmorensis H. B. Baker, 1932 – Marbled Disc
 Discus nigrimontanus Pilsbry, 1924 – Black Mountain disc
 Discus patulus (G. P. Deshayes, 1830) – domed disc
 Discus putrescens (R. T. Lowe, 1861)
 Discus retextus Shuttleworth, 1852
 Discus scutula Shuttleworth, 1852
 Discus selenitoides (Pilsbry, 1890) – file disc
 Discus shimekii (Pilsbry, 1890) – Striate Disc
 Discus textilis Shuttleworth, 1852 – extinct
 Discus whitneyi (Newcomb, 1864) – Forest Disc

References

External links

Discidae
Taxa named by Leopold Fitzinger
Gastropod genera